Richard Andvord (1839–1913) was a Norwegian businessperson.

Richard Andvord may also refer to:

Richard Andvord (born 1886) (1886–1965), Norwegian cavalry officer and diplomat
Richard Andvord (born 1920) (1920–1997), Norwegian businessperson and resistance member

See also
 Rich. Andvord, a Norwegian company